Lowie Stuer  (born ) is a Belgian volleyball player, member of the Belgium men's national volleyball team. Stuer competed for Belgium at the 2014 World Championship held in Poland.

In september 2017 he was named the best libero in the European Championship in Poland, where his team (the Red Dragons) ended 4th place. For the season 2018-2019 Lowie will be playing for Par-Ky Menen, a solid top 4 club in the Belgian Liga A.  And he's selected by Andrea Anastasi to play as libero with the Belgian Red Dragons at the World Championship in Italy/Bulgaria (sept 2018). With Par-Ky Menen, Lowie played libero and in the play-offs, he's team ended 4th in the Championship.  During summer, he will be joining the national team for the European Championship and the qualifying round for the Olympic Games in Japan. For the season 2019-2020 he played for Sète (http://www.aragodesete.fr).  Next season he will be playing for VC Menen (2nd tour of duty) and the national team.

Sporting achievements

Clubs
 National championships
 2013/2014  Belgian SuperCup, with Knack Roeselare
 2013/2014  Belgian Championship, with Knack Roeselare

Youth national team
 2012  CEV U20 European Championship
 2013  CEV U19 European Championship

Individual awards
 2017: CEV European Championship – Best Libero

External links
 Player profile at CEV.eu
 Player profile at WorldofVolley.com
 Player profile at Volleybox.net

References

1995 births
Living people
Belgian men's volleyball players
European Games competitors for Belgium
Volleyball players at the 2015 European Games
Belgian expatriate sportspeople in France
Expatriate volleyball players in France